Betchworth railway station serves the village of Betchworth in Surrey, England. It is on the North Downs Line,  measured from  via . All services are operated by Great Western Railway.

History
The station was opened in 1849 by the Reading, Guildford and Reigate Railway, which became part of the South Eastern Railway in 1852. The eastbound platform 1 is long enough for a four-coach train, but the westbound platform 2 can accommodate seven coaches.

In 1967, Quentin Crisp starred in the sixteen-minute film The Even Tenour of her Ways, which was shot at this railway station.

In 2017/18 and 2018/19, it was the least used station in Surrey, after patronage at Longcross increased.

Services

Betchworth Quarry Railways

The station was particularly significant for its connection with the Betchworth Quarry railways, which were built to serve the Dorking Greystone Lime Company's three pits north of the station.

The quarry railways had four different track gauges. The standard gauge part had a junction with the main line to the west of Betchworth station It ran via a reversing siding to the Eastern and Southern Kiln Batteries. A  gauge railway system began there and primarily served the quarry with lines diverging to the Main, Upper Western Whitestone and Eastern Greystone Pits. The other gauges serving the works were the  gauge line that ran from a standard gauge siding to the Hearthstone Mine, and a short  gauge section of track that ran exclusively between the Eastern and Southern Kiln Batteries.

The first engine to shunt on the standard gauge portion, Engine No. 1 of 1871, was unofficially named The Coffeepot. It is now preserved at Beamish Museum in County Durham. Another, Captain Baxter was renamed simply Baxter in 1947, the last engine ever to work the line, and the Rev. W.V. Awdry featured it in his book Stepney the "Bluebell" Engine. Baxter is preserved on the Bluebell Railway and was returned to traffic for that railway's 50th anniversary.

Two  gauge locomotives were also preserved. Townsend Hook, is at Amberley Chalk Pits Museum, having undergone a cosmtic restoration as a static exhibit. William Finlay, the sister engine of Townsend Hook, is preserved at the Narrow Gauge Railway Museum.

References

External links

Railway stations in Surrey
Former South Eastern Railway (UK) stations
Railway stations in Great Britain opened in 1849
Railway stations served by Great Western Railway
1849 establishments in England